The 2004 Cork Senior Hurling Championship was the 116th staging of the Cork Senior Hurling Championship since its establishment by the Cork County Board in 1887. The draw for the 2004 fixtures took place on 14 December 2003. The championship began on 2 May 2004 and ended on 31 October 2004.

Newtownshandrum were the defending champions, however, they were defeated by Cloyne in the semi-final stage.

On 31 October 2004, Na Piarsaigh won the championship following a 0-17 to 0-10 defeat of Cloyne in the final. This was their third championship title overall and their first in nine championship seasons.

Team changes

To Championship

Promoted from the Cork Intermediate Hurling Championship
 Bride Rovers

Results

Round 1

Round 2

Round 3

First round

Second round

Round 4

 Na Piarsaigh and Sarsfields received a bye.

Quarter-finals

Semi-finals

Final

Championship statistics

Top scorers

Top scorer overall

Top scorers in a single game

Miscellaneous
 Na Piarsaigh win their first title since 1995
 Cloyne qualify for the final for the first time.

References

Cork Senior Hurling Championship
Cork Senior Hurling Championship